Bayu Nugroho (born 11 May 1992) is an Indonesian professional footballer who plays as a midfielder for Liga 2 club PSPS Riau.

Honours

Club
Persebaya Surabaya
 East Java Governor Cup: 2020
Dewa United
 Liga 2 third place (play-offs): 2021

References

External links 
 

1992 births
Indonesian footballers
Living people
People from Surakarta
Sportspeople from Central Java
Association football wingers
PSIS Semarang players
Persis Solo players
Bhayangkara F.C. players
Dewa United F.C. players